Christopher St. John "Sinjin" Smith (born May 7, 1957, in Santa Monica, California) is a professional beach volleyball player. He won one U.S. championship and two World championships with Randy Stoklos.

He began to compete as a professional in the two man beach volleyball tournaments of Southern California at age fifteen. He went to college at UCLA, where he played setter and outside hitter in head coach Al Scates' 6-2 system. The UCLA Bruins won the national championship in Smith's freshman year.  The following year the Bruins did not make the final four, but as a junior the team again reached the finals before losing to Pepperdine. Smith was selected to the all tournament team. In his senior year in 1979 the Bruins again reached the finals, defeating cross town rival USC to win the national championship. Smith was again selected to the all-tournament team, and was voted the championship's most outstanding player. Smith was selected as an All American in both his junior and senior years. 
 
Smith won his first beach tournament with former UCLA teammate "Stormin" Mike Normand. His first Manhattan Beach Open was won in 1979 teaming with another UCLA alum, Jim Menges. In the early 1980s he made a successful beach team pairing with former UCLA teammate Karch Kiraly. They split up when Karch committed full time to the US National Men's Volleyball Team. He moved on to partner with Randy Stoklos, and the two became the most dominant pair in men's beach volleyball. Smith was the first player to reach 100 career open tournament wins. He was a primary force behind the growth of beach volleyball as a sport, and the development of the Association of Volleyball Professionals, which formalized the sport as a professional athletic competition.

The pair of Smith and Stoklos was featured in the video game Kings of the Beach released in 1988 for multiple computer platforms by Electronic Arts and in 1990 for the Nintendo Entertainment System by Konami, and also appeared in the 1990 film Side Out as the nemesis team of Rollo Vincent (Stoklos) and Billy Cross (Smith).

Acting
Smith had a brief career as a television actor, appearing most notably on an episode of Magnum, P.I. as Magnum's volleyball partner who winds up dead under suspicious circumstances.

References

External links
 
 
 Sinjin Smith, biography from Volleyball World Wide
 Sinjin Smith, biography from the Volleyball Hall of Fame

1957 births
Living people
American men's beach volleyball players
Beach volleyball players at the 1996 Summer Olympics
Olympic beach volleyball players of the United States
Sportspeople from Santa Monica, California
UCLA Bruins men's volleyball players
Competitors at the 1994 Goodwill Games
Goodwill Games medalists in beach volleyball